Helmut Kosmehl (born 27 September 1944 in Magdeburg) is a German professional handball and football player and football manager.

Career
He joined West Germany in 1964 and engages VfL Gummersbach with whom he won four League handball champions in 1967, 1970, 1971 and 1974. He has 27 caps for 14 goals with Germany men's national handball team.

In 1975, he joined to the second division football club Spandauer SV has lost its first 14 league games and two meetings with the hassle club. The club finished last in the league not winning just twice in 36 games, and cashes 115 goals during the season.

Helmut Kosmehl moved to Switzerland in 1976 and engages with the handball club Pfadi Winterthur
He coached the Mauritius, Seychelles and Dominica Seychelles national football teams.

In 2008, he was appointed to the direction of AmaZulu FC training center in South Africa.

References

External links

1944 births
Living people
German footballers
Association football forwards
German football managers
Expatriate football managers in Mauritius
Mauritius national football team managers
Expatriate football managers in Seychelles
Seychelles national football team managers
Expatriate football managers in Dominica
Dominica national football team managers
Sportspeople from Magdeburg
Footballers from Saxony-Anhalt
German expatriate football managers
German expatriate sportspeople in Mauritius
German expatriate sportspeople in Seychelles
German expatriate sportspeople in Dominica